Professor Oshiotse Andrew Okwilagwe is a Nigerian librarian, administrator and the Vice-Chancellor of Westland University, Iwo, Osun State and the first Nigerian professor of publishing.

Early life and education 
Prof. Okilagwe (born 17th July, 1951) hails from Jattu-Uzairue, Edo State. He holds a B.A. (1979), M.A. in Communication and Language from the University of Ibadan(1983), M.Litt (Publishing Studies) from the University of Stirling (1984). He obtained MLS in Library, Archival and Information Studies (1987), and in 1995, PhD in publishing from the University of Ibadan respectively.

Publications 

Prof. Okwilagwe has worked with over 450 authors on various publishing projects in Africa. His research focus is on the influence of Publishing, and Library and Information Science on national development, with over 65 articles published in learned journals.

References 

Nigerian librarians
Living people
1951 births
Academic staff of Westland University, Iwo

Vice-Chancellors of Nigerian universities